In mathematics, the Kalmanson combinatorial conditions are a set of conditions on the distance matrix used in determining the solvability of the traveling salesman problem.  These conditions apply to a special kind of cost matrix, the Kalmanson matrix, and are named after Kenneth Kalmanson.

References
.
.
.
.
.

Combinatorics